The Len Jus Building on Federal Avenue in Mason City, Iowa was constructed in 1882. It has a rare sheet-metal facade, manufactured by the Mesker Brothers. This building has been placed on Preservation Iowa's Most Endangered list because of its poor repair and indifferent ownership.

References

Buildings and structures in Mason City, Iowa
Commercial buildings completed in 1882